This is a list of Japanese political and military incidents, as classified by Japanese terminology in which incident was a euphemism applied during the beginning of history and through to the outbreak of the Pacific War.

Political incidents
 Sakuradamon Incident (1860) 
 Namamugi Incident
 Aomatsuba Incident

What the Japanese terminology euphemistically describes as incidents were the attempts at coup d'etat of the period starting in the 1920's.

Amakasu incident (1923)
March Incident (1931)
October incident (1931)
May 15 incident (1932)
League of Blood incident (1932)
Military Academy incident (1934)
Aizawa incident (1935)
February 26 incident (1936)
Kyūjō incident (8-15 Incident) (1945)

Military incidents
These include minor battles as well as major invasions and war crimes.

Port Arthur massacre (China) (1894)
Shantung incident (1927)
Huanggutun incident (June 4, 1928)
East Chinese Railway Incident (1929)
Manchouli incident, as Japanese name for Russian incursion to Manchouli in response for East Chinese Railway Incident
Jinan incident (1929)
Wushe incident biggest and the last rebellion against Japanese colonial forces in Taiwan (1930)
Wanpaoshan incident Japanese aggressive incursion in Wanpaoshan (July 1931)
Nakamura incident (July 1931)
Mukden incident, also called Manchurian incident, Liutiaoukou incident or 9.18 incident (1931), a staged sabotage of a South Manchuria Railway track.
Tientsin incident (1931) Riot in Tientsin fomented by Col. Kenji Doihara to provide cover for the removal of Puyi to Manchuria (Nov. 1931)
Shanghai incident, the first attempt to invade Shanghai metropolitan sector (1932)
North Chahar incident (1935)
Suiyuan incident (1936) Talk:List of Japanese political and military incidents
Lukouchiao incident or China incident, usually known as Marco Polo Bridge incident (7 July 1937)
Langfang incident (1937)
Guanganmen incident (1937)
Tongzhou incident (1937)
Panay incident Japanese air attack against American river patrol boat in Yang-Tze Kiang river (1937) also involving a British river patrol boat. (12 December 1937)
Changkufeng incident, also called Battle of Lake Khasan (July – August, 1938)
Kweilin incident, CNAC Chinese airline plane shot down by Japanese fighters over Pearl river, was the first aggression against civil aircraft in history(1938)
Tientsin incident, xenophobic Japanese aggression towards British subjects in Tientsin (1939)Talk:List of Japanese political and military incidents
Battle of Halhin Gol, also known as Nomonhan incident (May – September, 1939)
Tutuila incident, similar Japanese air strike against an American river patrol boat in Chungking, (31 July 1941)
1987 Okinawan Tu-16 airspace violation, The incident occurred on December 9, 1987, and was the first time in the history of the Self-Defense Forces that a warning shot was fired.
2013 Japan-China radar lock-on incident, The 2013 incident in which the Japanese Maritime Self-Defense Force destroyer JS Yūdachi (DD-103) was radar-radiated by the Chinese Navy.

References

Political And Military Incidents
Political And Military Incidents
Political And Military Incidents